Triplophysa gracilis is a species of stone loach in the genus Triplophysa. It is found in Pakistan, India, and China. It grows to  SL and lives in standing waters and deeper parts of rivers.

References

G
Freshwater fish of China
Freshwater fish of India
Fish of Pakistan
Fish described in 1877
Taxa named by Francis Day